Leonardo Daniel Ulineia Buta (born 5 June 2002) is a Portuguese professional footballer who plays for Italian club Udinese.

Club career 
Having grown through the youth ranks and reserve team of SC Braga, Leonardo Buta made his professional debut for the club on the 12 February 2022, replacing  Bruno Rodrigues at the 56th minute of a 2–1 home Primeira Liga win against Paços de Ferreira.

On 5 June 2022, Buta signed a five-year contract with Udinese in Italy.

International career 
Buta is a youth international for Portugal, playing with the under-17 during the 2018–19 season.

Personal life 
Born in a family of Angolan descent, Leonardo is the younger brother of professional footballer Aurélio Buta.

References

External links

2002 births
Living people
Portuguese footballers
Portugal youth international footballers
Association football defenders
People from Anadia, Portugal
S.C. Braga players
Udinese Calcio players
Primeira Liga players
Sportspeople from Aveiro District
Portuguese expatriate footballers
Expatriate footballers in Italy
Portuguese expatriate sportspeople in Italy